This is a list of Dutch television related events from 1959.

Events
17 February - Teddy Scholten is selected to represent Netherlands at the 1959 Eurovision Song Contest with her song "Een beetje". She is selected to be the fourth Dutch Eurovision entry during Nationaal Songfestival held at AVRO Studios in Hilversum.
11 March - The Netherlands wins the 4th Eurovision Song Contest in Cannes, France. The winning song is "Een beetje" performed by Teddy Scholten.

Debuts

Television shows

1950s
NOS Journaal (1956–present)
Pipo de Clown (1958-1980)

Ending this year

Births

Deaths